Arginia is a small village in the southern part of the island of Kefalonia, Greece. In 2011 its population was 15. It is situated on the southeastern slope of the Mount Ainos, at about 550 m elevation. It is 2 km north of Valerianos, 3 km west of Pastra, 8 km southwest of Poros and 22 km southeast of Argostoli. Arginia was devastated by the 1953 Ionian earthquake.

Population

See also

List of settlements in Cephalonia

External links
Arginia at the GTP Travel Pages

References

Populated places in Cephalonia
Eleios-Pronnoi